Görkem Doğan (born May 11, 1998) is a Turkish professional basketball player who plays as a Center, and plays for Bahçeşehir Koleji of the Basketbol Süper Ligi (BSL) and Basketball Champions League.

Professional career

Pınar Karşıyaka (2016–2020) 
Görkem Doğan started his professional career at Pınar Karşıyaka in 2016–17 season and stayed with this club for four seasons.

Darüşşafaka (2020–2022)
On September 28, 2020, he has signed with Darüşşafaka of the Basketbol Süper Ligi (BSL).

On June 27, 2022, he has signed with Bahçeşehir Koleji of the Basketbol Süper Ligi (BSL).

References

External links
Görkem Doğan Champions League Profile
Görkem Doğan TBLStat.net Profile
Görkem Doğan Eurobasket Profile
Görkem Doğan TBL Profile

Living people
1998 births
Bahçeşehir Koleji S.K. players
Centers (basketball)
Darüşşafaka Basketbol players
Karşıyaka basketball players
Sportspeople from Muğla
Turkish men's basketball players
21st-century Turkish people